Randy Scott Santana Hernández (born 1 January 1983 in Tomatlán, Jalisco, México) is a Mexican former professional footballer who played as a defender. He debuted in the Primera División on 13 November 2004 in a 2–2 draw with Chivas de Guadalajara.

External links
 
 Mexican League Statistics at Guardian.touch-line.com
 

Living people
1983 births
Mexican footballers
Association football defenders
Tecos F.C. footballers
Guerreros de Hermosillo F.C. footballers
Liga MX players
Ascenso MX players
Footballers from Jalisco